In mathematics, and in particular functional analysis, the shift operator also known as translation operator is an operator that takes a function 
to its translation . In time series analysis, the shift operator is called the lag operator.

Shift operators are examples of linear operators, important for their simplicity and natural occurrence. The shift operator action on functions of a real variable plays an important role in harmonic analysis, for example, it appears in the definitions of almost periodic functions, positive-definite functions, derivatives, and convolution. Shifts of sequences (functions of an integer variable) appear in diverse areas such as Hardy spaces, the theory of abelian varieties, and the theory of symbolic dynamics, for which the baker's map is an explicit representation.

Definition

Functions of a real variable

The shift operator  (where ) takes a function  on R to its translation  , 
 

A practical operational calculus representation of the linear operator  in terms of the plain derivative  was introduced by Lagrange,

This, then, is a formal encoding of the Taylor expansion in Heaviside's calculus.

The operator thus provides the prototype 
for Lie's celebrated advective flow for Abelian groups,

where the canonical coordinates  (Abel functions) are defined such that 

For example, it easily follows that   yields scaling,

hence  (parity); likewise, 
 yields 

 yields 

 yields 

etc.

The initial condition of the flow and the group property completely determine the entire Lie flow, providing a solution to the translation functional equation

Sequences

The left shift operator acts on one-sided infinite sequence of numbers by

and on two-sided infinite sequences by

The right shift operator acts on one-sided infinite sequence of numbers by

and on two-sided infinite sequences by

The right and left shift operators acting on two-sided infinite sequences are called bilateral shifts.

Abelian groups

Properties of the shift operator

The shift operator acting on real- or complex-valued functions or sequences is a linear operator  which preserves most of the standard norms which appear in functional analysis. Therefore, it is usually a continuous operator with norm one.

Action on Hilbert spaces

In both cases, the (left) shift operator satisfies the following commutation relation with the Fourier transform:

This observation is at the heart of the construction of many unitary dilations of isometries.

The spectrum of S is the unit disk. The shift S is one example of a Fredholm operator; it has Fredholm index −1.

Generalization

Jean Delsarte introduced the notion of generalized shift operator (also called generalized displacement operator); it was further developed by Boris Levitan.

 Associativity: let . Then .
 There exists  in  such that  is the identity operator.
In this case, the set  is called a hypergroup.

See also
Arithmetic shift
Logical shift
Finite difference
 Translation operator (quantum mechanics)

Notes

Bibliography
 
 Marvin Rosenblum and James Rovnyak, Hardy Classes and Operator Theory, (1985) Oxford University Press.

Unitary operators